Alan McCarthy (born 11 January 1972) is a retired footballer. He played as a defender. During his career he played in the Football League First Division (later the Premier League) for Queens Park Rangers. During his time at QPR he spent loan spells at Watford and Plymouth Argyle, before joining Leyton Orient in 1995. Internationally, he played for England at youth level, but Wales at under-21 level.

References

External links

Living people
1972 births
Footballers from Wandsworth
Association football defenders
English footballers
Queens Park Rangers F.C. players
Plymouth Argyle F.C. players
Leyton Orient F.C. players
Premier League players
English Football League players
Watford F.C. players